Velódromo is a metro station located on Line 9 of the Mexico City Metro. It is named after the nearby Agustín Melgar Olympic Velodrome, or bicycle-racing venue, built for the 
1968 Summer Olympics that were held in Mexico City.

Velódromo is an elevated station built at the portion of Line 9 that branches away from Viaducto Río de La Piedad to follow
Eje 3 Sur (Avenida Morelos) when travelling west toward Metro Tacubaya.  The station opened on 26 August 1987.  The logo for the station shows the silhouette of a bicycle racer.
It serves the Jardín Balbuena and the Granjas México neighborhoods.

Local bus service to the station includes trolleybus line S of STE, which runs west to Metro Chapultepec along the arterial thoroughfares known as Eje 2 Sur and Eje 2A Sur and is one of two high-frequency trolleybus lines that STE calls "Zero-Emissions Corridors".

From 23 April to 15 May 2020, the station was temporarily closed due to the COVID-19 pandemic in Mexico.

Ridership

Nearby
 Palacio de los Deportes – nearby sports arena and indoor concert venue
 Foro Sol – nearby baseball stadium and outdoor concert venue

References

External links
 

Mexico City Metro Line 9 stations
Railway stations opened in 1987
1987 establishments in Mexico
Mexico City Metro stations in Iztacalco
Mexico City Metro stations in Venustiano Carranza, Mexico City
Accessible Mexico City Metro stations